Bhabra Bazaar is an old bazaar located in Rawalpindi, Pakistan.

A food street and a historic haveli, Sajan Singh Haveli, is also situated in the bazaar.

History
Bhabra Bazaar was founded by the followers of Jainism some centuries ago. According to historians, along with members of another tribe called Rawal, Jains also founded the city of Rawalpindi. After partition in 1947, followers of Jainism migrated to India along with Hindus and Sikhs.

References

Tourist attractions in Rawalpindi
Shopping districts and streets in Pakistan
Populated places in Rawalpindi City
Rawalpindi City
Bazaars in Rawalpindi